CompassionArt is a studio album by the songwriters' charity of the same name. It features the entire CompassionArt song writing team, Paul Baloche, Chris Tomlin, Tim Hughes, Matt Redman, Darlene Zschech, Israel Houghton, Michael W. Smith, Graham Kendrick, Andy Park, Steven Curtis Chapman, Stu Garrard and charity co-founder Martin Smith, along with several other collaborators. All proceeds from the recording directly benefited charities of the songwriters' choosing.

Production 
On 7–11 January 2008, Martin Smith invited the newly formed CompassionArt team, made up of various CCM artists, to Scotland for a writing retreat. During this time the group wrote 22 songs, 14 of which made their way onto the album.

In February 2008, the majority of the album was recorded at Abbey Road studios in London. Martin Smith also travelled to Uganda in order to visit the Watoto Children's Choir and record their contribution to the album. One of the songs which was recorded was "Fill My Cup." This had previously been written by Delirious? as a potential song for inclusion on Kingdom of Comfort, although it was never released.

Singles 
In April 2008, "So Great" was released internationally on iTunes as a single. It was also performed live at that year's Dove Awards by Michael W. Smith, Israel Houghton, Paul Baloche, Chris Tomlin and Christy Nockels. The song was also included on the compilation album WOW Hits 1. Also "King of Wonders" was released to Christian radio in November 2008.

Release 

The album was released internationally in November 2008, although release was delayed until January 2009 in North America to avoid clashing with new albums from Michael W. Smith and Chris Tomlin. The album also includes a documentary DVD, and was released alongside a book, The Art of Compassion, written by the song writing team.

Some of the songs were available for free download, although a donation was requested.

Track listing

Awards

In 2010, the album was nominated for a Dove Award for Special Event Album of the Year at the 41st GMA Dove Awards.

References

Charity albums
CompassionArt albums
2008 albums